Works by Benjamin Henry Latrobe, a British-born architect, were influenced by Greek Revival styles and those of British architect John Soane.  Latrobe emigrated to the United States, living initially in Virginia, then in Philadelphia, before being hired to work on government projects in Washington, D.C.  His works most notably included the central portion of the United States Capitol, along with designing the porticoes of the White House.  He also designed numerous houses and other buildings.

Latrobe worked on various engineering projects, as well, including the Philadelphia waterworks, along with projects in New Orleans where he spent the last years of his life.  He wrote quite a bit, including extensive notes in his journals, which have since been published, and he translated works by others.

Architecture
Latrobe's many architectural works include:

Writing
Benjamin Henry Latrobe authored several books and translated others, including:
 Characteristic Anecdotes ... to Illustrate the Character of Frederick the Great (1788)
 Authentic Elucidation of the History of Counts Struensee [sic] and Brandt and of the Revolution in Denmark in the Year 1772 (1789)

James Bruce hired Latrobe in 1790 to help put together Travels, a memoir of Bruce's journeys in Africa.

After he arrived in the United States, Latrobe befriended Constantin-François Chassebœuf, comte de Volney, who stimulated an interest in geology.  Latrobe kept numerous journals with geological notes and published a number of papers, including "Memoir on the Sand Hills of Cape Henry" (1799), Transactions of the American Philosophical Society (vol. 4, pp 439–44).

Notes

References

External links
 

Benjamin Henry Latrobe buildings and structures
Latrobe, Benjamin Henry